Fudbalski klub Voždovac, commonly known as Voždovac, is a professional football club located in Voždovac, a municipality of Belgrade, Serbia.

Nicknamed "The Dragons", they experienced little success in the Yugoslavian era, but have become one of Belgrade's best and most stable clubs in modern times since Serbia's independence.

History

The club was formed in 1912, under the name SK Dušanovac and its president in that year was Danilo Stojanović, "Čika Dača" who was also the coach in that year. The club was named after Dušanovac, a suburb in Belgrade where the club was formed. Initially it was a club whose players and followers were mostly students from the Economics Gymnasium. After the end of World War I the club substantially improved however it never archived to be in the top like other clubs such as BSK Belgrade or SK Jugoslavija.

In 1929, it is renamed into Voždovački SK (Voždovački sport klub). The main success in this period was the winning of the II League of Belgrade Football Subassociation in the 1933–34 season, and the III League of Belgrade in 1948–49. In the 1963–64 season, they won the Serbian Republic League, then the Yugoslav third tier, and promoted to the Yugoslav Second League. After Red Star Belgrade's new ground Marakana was built between 1959 and 1963, Voždovački SK played its home matches on Marakana's secondary pitch with bleachers around it.

In 1973, another local club, Sloboda Belgrade, formed in 1953 and Belgrade League champion in 1968, was dissolved. The municipal authorities decided to hand Sloboda's ground over to Voždovački, which then changed its name to FK Voždovac. The first major achievement was the winning of the Belgrade Football Association Cup in 1975. During the following three decades Voždovac competed mostly in the lower Serbian leagues, until the season of 2003–04, when they won the Serbian League Belgrade without a single defeat, achieving promotion to the Serbian First League, the national second tier.

On 28 June 2005, Železnik won the Serbia and Montenegro Cup but, struggling financially, merged with Voždovac. As a result, Voždovac gained access to the 2005–06 First League of Serbia and Montenegro, finishing in third place and qualifying for European competition. However, due to the continuing financial difficulties after the merger, club officials decided not to request the license for European competitions.

Ever since the new modern stadium opened in August 2013, the club has been one of the most stable in Serbian football due to having strong sponsorship from the shopping centre outlets that perform business under/within the stadium. A modern approach was taken by the directors of the club to attract a more younger supporter base by focusing on a new cool approach, a modern website was created for the club, which was by far the most attractive of all clubs in Serbian football apart from the big two Belgrade clubs, a new modern crest was also designed which incorporated the club's nickname with a red dragon now upon the clubs crest which replaced the old dour crest, The aim was to be different from most other Serbian clubs who either carry/carried communist-era names or their presentation technology wise is dour.

Voždovac finished the 2019/20 season in 8th place under manager Radomir Koković who was fired late in the season due to a run of losses, former player Jovan Damjanović took over the managers role and guided the club to a safe mid table finish.

Stadium
The old Voždovac Stadium was a multi-purpose stadium. It was used mostly for football matches and was the home ground of Voždovac, with a capacity of 5,780 people. It was demolished in 2011.

Voždovac play their home games at the Voždovac Stadium located on the fourth floor of a shopping center and it meets all UEFA regulations. It has 5,174 seats, the pitch is 24 meters above ground while the tallest stands are 45 meters above.

The stadium was opened for a league game against Jagodina in the fourth round of the Superliga on 31 August 2013. It is also the first time a Superliga game was played on artificial grass.

Supporters

Groups
The organized supporters of FK Voždovac are the Invalidi (Invalids). However, the first organised supporting group was formed in 1987, and was named Vilenjaci (The Elves). Initially consisted of about 30 members, mostly former and youth players from the neighborhood. Along with Vilenjaci, another group named Zmajevi (Dragons) appeared, which is simultaneously the traditional nickname of the club. Vilenjaci grew with time, and they were often involved in disturbs. They made an effort to be original in their supporting. Pirotechnical fireworks were a usual way of provoking match interruptions.

In 1989, another group named Genoes United was formed in the east stand of the stadium, and by that time Zmajevi accepted to join Vilenjaci. Shortly afterwards Genoes also joined Vilenjaci on the western stand. In the season 1989–90 another group was formed, Hasini Trafikari, named after a former club player, nicknamed Hasa. Initially formed in the south stand, they would also ended up merging with Vilenjaci on the western stand. However, when it looked that the group was stronger than ever, it ended up being disbanded.

In 1990, a new group, that was initially more similar to a street gang than to football fans, was formed and named Invalidi. During the 1990s, the group was constantly growing, and besides football their presence was also noticed in other sports events in which the club participated, most notably in women's handball. Obviously the most inspiring period for club fans was the period the club competed in the top league. Today the group consists of about 100 young men.

Friendships
The fans have a strong friendship with fans of OFK Belgrade. They also have good relations with fans of ŁKS Łomża.

Honours
 Serbian Republic League
 Winners (1): 1963–64
 Serbian League Belgrade
 Winners (2): 2003–04, 2011–12

Kit manufacturers and shirt sponsors

Current squad

Out on loan

Club officials

Coaching staff

Notable former players
This is a list of FK Voždovac players with senior national team appearances:

 Dušan Anđelković
 Stefan Babović
 Nikola Beljić
 Dušan Đokić
 Miloš Kolaković
 Slobodan Marković
 Miloš Mihajlov
 Aleksandar Pantić
 Dejan Rađenović
 Aleksandar Živković
 Mario Božić
 Vladan Grujić
 Nermin Haskić
 Dušan Kerkez
 Nemanja Supić
 Sekou Keita
 Tome Kitanovski
 Darko Božović
 Darko Bulatović
 Đorđije Ćetković
 Mladen Kašćelan
 Adam Marušić
 Nemanja Nikolić
 Nikola Vujnović
 Marko Dević

For the list of all current and former players with Wikipedia article, please see: :Category:FK Voždovac players.

Coaching history
 Danilo Stojanović (1912) 
 Mlađa Mitrović
 Zoran Lončar
 Mihailo Ivanović (2005–2006)
 Tomislav Sivić (June 2006–August 2006)
 Dušan Jevrić (August 2006–February 2007)
 Miroslav Vukašinović (February 2007–April 2007)
 Mihailo Ivanović (April 2007 – 2007)
 Čedomir Đoinčević (2007–November 2007)
 Dragi Kaličanin (2008–09)
 Mihailo Ivanović (July 1, 2012 – March 31, 2013)
 Aleksandar Janjić (April 1, 2013 – June 30, 2013)
 Nenad Lalatović (July 1, 2013 – Jan 16, 2014)
 Zoran Milinković (Jan 18, 2014–2015)

References

External links
 Official website 
 Club profile and squad at Srbijafudbal

 
Football clubs in Yugoslavia
Association football clubs established in 1912
Football clubs in Belgrade
1912 establishments in Serbia
Voždovac